Hemileuca chinatiensis, the chinati sheepmoth, is a species of insect in the family Saturniidae. It is found in North America.

The MONA or Hodges number for Hemileuca chinatiensis is 7739.

References

Further reading

 
 
 

Hemileucinae
Articles created by Qbugbot
Moths described in 1943